Joaquín Benjumea y Burín (17 January 1878 – 30 December 1963) was a Spanish politician who served as Minister of Agriculture and acting Minister of Labour of Spain between 1939 and 1941 and as Minister of Finance between 1941 and 1951, during the Francoist dictatorship.

References

1878 births
1963 deaths
Agriculture ministers of Spain
Economy and finance ministers of Spain
Labour ministers of Spain
Government ministers during the Francoist dictatorship